is a Japanese tokusatsu superhero science fiction adventure television series produced by Tsuburaya Productions in two seasons aired from July 7, 1978 to June 29, 1979. The series lasted for a total of 52 episodes. Go's enemies include dinosaurs which are telepathically controlled by the aliens. He has the ability to stop time for 30 seconds. Koseidon is the name allowing Go and his mates to time travel. A film adaptation, titled Koseison, is planned by Tencent Pictures, with Takashige Ichise producing.

References

External links
Koseidon 
Dinosaur Corps Koseidon on IMDb

1978 Japanese television series debuts
Television series about dinosaurs
Tokusatsu television series
Tsuburaya Productions
1979 Japanese television series endings
Television shows adapted into films
Superhero television shows
Japanese science fiction television series
Adventure television series